(occasionally credited as Hiroyuki Nanba) is a Japanese musician. He has composed for and arranged songs from Japanese anime, OVA and video games. Notably, Hiroyuki Namba composed for Dallos, the first anime Original video animation. However, in the United States, he is known for composing the soundtrack to the Armitage III film. Namba plays keyboards in Sense of Wonder, a Japanese progressive rock band.

Works
 1983 - Dallos (OVA)
 1987 - Ladius (OVA)
 1987 - Digital Devil Story: Megami Tensei (OVA)
 1988 - Starship Troopers (OVA)
 1989 - Baoh (OVA)
 1989 - Wrestler Gundan Seisenshi Robin Jr. (TV series)
 1991 - Sohryuden: Legend of the Dragon Kings (OVA)
 1995 - Armitage III (OVA)
 1996 - Burn Up W (OVA)
 1997 - Armitage III: Poly-Matrix (Movie)
 1998 - DT Eightron (TV series)
 2000 - Transformers: Car Robot (TV series)
 2014 - Space Dandy (TV series)

Associated acts
 Sense of Wonder (1987 -)
 Tatsuro Yamashita (1978 -)
 Horii Katsumi Project
 Nuovo Immigrato (1997 -)
 Yajuh Ohkoku (1997-)
 Acoustic Progressive Jazz (2000 -)
 ExhiVision (2003?)

Discography

Hiroyuki Namba solo

Sense of Wonder

Image albums (Hiroyuki Namba and Sense of Wonder)

Hiroyuki Namba and Sense of Wonder

Arrangements
 1988 - Music from Ys II (tracks 26~29)
 1988 - Sorcerian Super Arrange Version
 1988 - Sorcerian Super Arrange Version II Plus Sorcerian System Vol. 1 (tracks 1~7)
 1989 - Sorcerian Super Arrange Version III Sengoku Sorcerian vs. Pyramid Sorcerian (tracks 1~3)
 1989 - Falcom Sound Catalog Special Digest Disc (tracks 1, 5~11)
 1989 - Ys III: Wanderers from Ys -Super Arrange Version- (tracks 1, 2, 4~9)
 1992 - Falcom "NAMBA" Collection
 1998 - Very Best of Ys (track 11)
 2001 - Genso Suikoden Music Collection Produced by Hiroyuki Namba
 2003 - Ys Special Collection -All About Falcom- Memorial Sounds (tracks 1, 4)
 2005 - Heavy Metal Thunder -The Recordings- (composed and arranged track 9)

Soundtracks
 1997 - Armitage III - Poly-Matrix

External links
 Hiroyuki Namba portal
 
 難波弘之 公式サイト

1953 births
Anime composers
Japanese composers
Japanese male composers
Living people
Progressive rock musicians